Yesenin is a 2005 Russian biographical eleven-episode television miniseries, directorial debut of Igor Zaitsev. It outlines the conspiracy version of the death of the Russian poet Sergei Yesenin. The series is based on the novel Yesenin. Story of a Murder by Vitali Bezrukov, and the main role was played by his son Sergey Bezrukov.

Plot
The series has two parallel storylines. One takes place in the 1980s. MUR investigator Lieutenant Colonel Alexander Khlystov (prototype - Eduard Khlystalov) receives by post a posthumous photograph of Sergei Yesenin. He must conduct the business according to the law, to register and file away the letter. However, the Lieutenant-Colonel does otherwise - he begins his own investigation. Khlystov finds materials related to Yesenin's life, and also searches for direct witnesses who personally knew the poet. The further the investigation comes, the more evidence in favor of Yesenin's murder by the conspiracy of the Soviet Government. Khlystov even wants to insist on exhumation, but it turns out that this is impossible: the foundation was concreted in order to affix the monument to Yesenin on his grave. And now, when there is very little to prove the murder of Yesenin, the main witness suddenly perishes. On the same day Khlystov himself is killed in a car crash. The investigation remains unfinished.

The second storyline tells about Yesenin's life from the moment of his service in the army before the funeral. The film shows the main events of the poet's life, including his military service, coming to Petrograd, becoming a poet, communicating with Russia's most important figures, traveling around the country and the world, life with Isadora Duncan and his final years. The last day of Esenin's life is shown in detail. The fate of the people with whom Sergei Alexandrovich was directly connected is told in the scene depicting the poet's funeral.

Cast

Sergey Bezrukov as Sergey Yesenin
Alexandr Mikhailov as Lieutenant Colonel Alexander Evgenievich Khlystov
Oleg Tabakov as General Alexei Mikhailovich Simagin
Dmitry Scherbina as Anatoly Marienhof
Aleksandr Robak as Ivan Pribludny
Pavel Derevyanko as Alexei Ganin
Sean Young as Isadora Duncan
Gary Busey as Singer, the former husband of Duncan
Christina Popandopulo as Lola Kinel, translator
Yulia Peresild as Katerina Esenina
Denis Nikiforov as Sandro Kusikov
Maxim Lagashkin as Aleksei Kruchenykh
Kseniya Rappoport as Galina Benislavskaya
Marina Zudina as Zinaida Reich
Aleksey Shevchenkov as Alexander Tarasov-Rodionov
Yevgeny Koryakovsky as Boris Pasternak
Andrey Rudensky as Alexander Blok
Anna Snatkina as Grand Duchess Tatiana
Alexey Grishin as Osip Mandelstam
Irina Bezrukova as Lydia Kashina
Avangard Leontiev as Anatoly Lunacharsky
Gosha Kutsenko as Yakov Blumkin
Konstantin Khabensky as Leon Trotsky
Alexander Mezentsev as Felix Dzerzhinsky
Alexander Mokhov as Mikhail Frunze
Andrey Krasko as Joseph Stalin
Oleg Komarov as Grigory Zinoviev
Roman Madyanov as Sergey Kirov
Maria Golubkina as Sophia Tolstaya
Tatyana Lutaeva as Olga Dieterichs-Tolstaya
Yekaterina Guseva as Augusta Miklashevskaya
Ekaterina Untilova as Empress Alexandra Fedorovna
Evgeny Dyatlov as Vladimir Mayakovsky
Peter Merkuriev as Vsevolod Meyerhold
Oleg Lopukhov as Vasily Nasedkin
Vladimir Goryansky as Nikolai Klyuev
Daniil Spivakovsky as A. Vetlugin
Andrey Leonov as Alexander Sakharov
Olga Krasko as Lena, employee of the archive
Nikolay Olyalin as Samokhin, former employee of the GPU
Yuri Sherstnev as Mikhalych, pathologist
Valentina Telichkina as Yesenin's mother
Vitali Bezrukov as Alexander Nikitich, Yesenin's father
Irina Apeksimova as Anna Berzin
Alexander Tyutin as Simagin
Sergey Perelygin as Alyoshin
Sergey Astakhov as Schneider
Aleksei Maklakov as Chagin
Nikita Tarasov as Sergey Gorodetsky
Sergey Kuryshev as Grigori Rasputin
Oleg Mazurov as Yakulov (not in the credits)
Mikhail Krylov as Wolf Erlich

Production
Scenes depicting Italy were shot in Odessa and the ones in Paris were filmed in Venice. Other locations included Konstantinovo, Yaroslavl, St. Petersburg and Moscow. Principal photography lasted for 155 days.

Gary Busey insisted that a fight scene would be written in the script specially for him.

When Zaitsev was ill, Sergei Bezrukov served as director. He was also the creative producer and the one who decided to hire Sean Young for the role of Isadora Duncan.

Konstantin Khabensky would later reprise his role as Leon Trotsky in the 2017 TV series.

References

External links
 

Channel One Russia original programming
Russian drama television series
2005 Russian television series debuts
2005 Russian television series endings
2000s Russian television series
Russian television miniseries
Russian biographical films
Cultural depictions of Sergei Yesenin
Cultural depictions of Isadora Duncan
Cultural depictions of Leon Trotsky
Cultural depictions of Joseph Stalin
Russian biographical television series